The Central District of Firuzabad County is a district (bakhsh) in Firuzabad County, Fars Province, Iran. At the 2006 census, its population was 86,208, in 18,946 families.  The District has one city: Firuzabad. The District has two rural districts (dehestan): Ahmadabad Rural District and Jaydasht Rural District.

References 

Firuzabad County
Districts of Fars Province